The Hillbilly 100 is an annual dirt Super Late Model "Crown Jewel" race held every year on Labor Day weekend. The Hillbilly Hundred, promoted by famed event promoter Carl Short, is the oldest running super late model event and brings enormous history and tradition to the state of West Virginia. Started in 1967, the Hillbilly 100 was held at Pennsboro Speedway every year until 1998, when the race was moved to Tyler County Speedway in Middlebourne, West Virginia. Then in 2010 the race moved to West Virginia Motor Speedway, and once again in 2012 to I-77 Raceway Park up until 2016. Now the Hillbilly 100 is back at Tyler County Speedway where the 2009 event had a purse in excess of $125,000, with $1,000 to start the feature and $41,000 to win. As of 2017, the race has a purse of $25,000. In 2018, the 50th annual Hillbilly 100 promoter Carl Short paid $50,000 to win.

Other events included in the two-day Hillbilly weekend are:
 Hillbilly 50 - Steel block late models
 Outhouse 30 - Modifides
 White Lightning 25 - Semi-Mods
 Sour Mash 20 - Mod Lites

Hillbilly 100 winners
† Indicates National Dirt Late Model Hall of Fame Driver

‡ Indicates National Dirt Late Model Hall of Fame Sportsman
1967 Don Gregory
1968 Ray Neece
1969 No Race Held
1970 Clate Husted
1971 Danny Dean †
1972 Dorus Wisecarver
1973 Bob Wearing, Sr. †
1974 Bob Wearing, Sr. 
1975 Bob Wearing, Sr. 
1976 Bob Wearing, Sr. 
1977 No Race Held
1978 Gene McNeely
1979 Danny Dean 
1980 Rodney Combs †
1981 Freddy Smith  †
1982 Charlie Swartz †
1983 Freddy Smith  
1984 Larry Moore †
1985 Jack Boggs †
1986 Jack Boggs 
1987 Jack Boggs 
1988 Donnie Moran †
1989 Donnie Moran 
1990 Buck Simmons †
1991 Rodney Combs 
1992 Rodney Combs 
1993 Davey Johnson
1994 Bill Frye †
1995 Bart Hartman
1996 Todd Andrews
1997 Rod Conley
1998 Steve Shaver
1999 Davey Johnson
2000 Davey Johnson
2001 Donnie Moran 
2002 Billy Moyer †
2003 Chub Frank †
2004 Mike Marlar
2005 Clint Smith
2006 Earl Pearson Jr.
2007 Eddie Carrier Jr.
2008 Jimmy Owens ‡
2009 Ray Cook
2010 Scott Bloomquist †
2011 No Race Held
2012 Mike Marlar
2013 Jimmy Owens
2014 Don O'Neal
2015 Scott Bloomquist  †
2016 Scott Bloomquist 
2017 Jonathan Davenport
2018 Brandon Overton  
2019 Josh Richards

See also
Dirt track racing in the United States
National Dirt Late Model Hall of Fame

References

External links
2006 Hillbilly 100 article at WhoWon.com, dated March 14, 2006, Retrieved July 8, 2007

Dirt track racing in the United States
Auto races in the United States
Motorsport in West Virginia